Horaiclavus adenensis is a species of sea snails, a marine gastropod mollusc in the family Horaiclavidae.

Description
The length of the shell attains 4 mm.

Distribution
This marine species occurs off the Gulf of Aden.

References

 Bonfitto A. & Morassi M. (2014) Two new Horaiclavus (Horaiclavidae, Conoidea) species from the Indo-Pacific region. Zootaxa 3821(1): 146–150

External links
 

adenensis
Gastropods described in 2014